The Press Council was a British voluntary press organisation founded under threat of statutory regulation as the General Council in 1953, with a non-binding regulatory framework. Through most of its history the council was funded by newspaper proprietors, with the stated aim of maintaining high standards of ethics in journalism. The General Council was reformed as the Press Council in 1962, with 20 per cent lay members. In 1980 the National Union of Journalists withdrew from membership. In 1991, the Press Council was replaced by the Press Complaints Commission.

First era: 1947–1962 
The first Royal Commission on the Press recommended in 1949 that a General Council of the Press should be formed to govern the behaviour of the print media. In response to a threat of statutory regulation, the General Council of the Press was formed in 1953, membership being restricted to newspaper editors, funded by newspaper proprietors. By the time of the Second Royal Commission on the Press in 1962, the General Council had been subject to considerable criticism. The commission's report demanded improvement, particularly the inclusion of members that were not employed by print media.

Second era: 1962–1980 
In 1962, following the recommendations of the  Second Royal Commission on the Press, the Press Council was formed. Twenty percent of the membership were required to be lay members, who were not employed by a newspaper.

In the latter half of 1967, the Press Council Headquarters were moved from Ludgate House to Salisbury Square, a location the Press Council described as the 'very centre of London's newspaper land'.

During this period the Press Council published a series of guidance booklets.

 Contempt of Court (1967)
 Privacy (1971)
 Defamation (1973)

The Press Council was criticised extensively in the Younger report on Privacy in 1973 and in the report of the Third Royal Commission on the Press, in 1977. The third Commission urged the development of a written Code of Practice. The Press Council rejected this proposal, and in 1980, the NUJ withdrew from membership on the grounds that the council was incapable of reform.

Third era: 1980–1991 
The Press Council had lost the confidence of many in the media, and the 1980s saw what people labelled as some of the worst excesses of unethical journalism and intrusions into privacy by the tabloid press. In response to two Private Members' Bills promoting privacy laws, the government set up a committee chaired by David Calcutt QC to investigate in 1989. At the same time, under the chairmanship of Louis Blom-Cooper, the Press Council transferred its funding to the Press Standards Board of Finance and began work on the development of a written Code of Practice.

The 1990 Calcutt report recommended the setting up of a new Press Complaints Commission to replace the Press Council. The new Commission would be given 18 months to prove non-statutory self-regulation could work effectively and if it failed to do so, then a statutory system would be introduced.

See also 

 Council for Mass Media in Finland

References 

1953 establishments in the United Kingdom
1991 disestablishments in the United Kingdom
Journalism ethics
Mass media complaints authorities
Self-regulatory organisations in the United Kingdom
Consumer organisations in the United Kingdom